This is a list of Nigerian films released in 2002.

Films

See also
List of Nigerian films

References

External links
2003 films at the Internet Movie Database

2002
Lists of 2002 films by country or language
Films